Gilutongan is one of the islands comprising the Olango Island Group, a group of islands in between Mactan and the Danajon Bank in the Philippines. Most of the Olango islands are part of Lapu-Lapu City, Gilutongan, however, is under the jurisdiction of the municipality of Cordova, Cebu. The population of Gilutongan is 1,606.

The island is one of the destinations of island-hopping tours because the island has white-sand beaches and a marine sanctuary, where tourists can do snorkeling and underwater diving activities.

The island is locally administered by Barangay Gilutongan. The nearby uninhabited Nalusuan Island is also part of the territory of the barangay. Gilutongan has one public school, Gilutongan Integrated School.

In December 2021, Typhoon Rai or Supertyphoon Odette has damaged 85% of the houses in Gilutongan and most of the residents' boats were wrecked. The local government, civil society organizations and the Philippine Navy provided relief assistance to affected families in the island.

See also
 List of beaches in the Philippines
 List of islands by population density

References

Islands of Cebu
Tourist attractions in Cebu
Beaches of the Philippines